Fitjar is a municipality in Vestland county, Norway. The municipality is located in the traditional district of Sunnhordland. Fitjar municipality includes the northern part of the island of Stord and the hundreds of surrounding islands, mostly to the northwest of the main island. The administrative centre of the municipality is the village of Fitjar.

The  municipality is the 317th largest by area out of the 356 municipalities in Norway. Fitjar is the 223rd most populous municipality in Norway with a population of 3,117.

General information

The parish of Fitje was established as a municipality on 1 January 1863 when it was separated from the large Stord Municipality. Initially, the population of Fitje was 2,313. On 1 January 1868, a small area in the municipality of Finnaas (population: 10) was transferred to Fitje. In 1900, the name was changed to Fitjar. The original municipality included all of the land surrounding the Selbjørnsfjorden.

During the 1960s, there were many municipal mergers across Norway due to the work of the Schei Committee. On 1 January 1964, the area of Fitjar located north of the Selbjørnsfjorden on the islands of Huftarøy and Selbjørn (population: 696) was transferred to the neighboring Austevoll Municipality. On 1 January 1995, the islands of Aga, Agasystra, Gisøya, Vikøya, Selsøy, Risøya, and many smaller surrounding islands (population: 225) were transferred from Fitjar to the neighboring Bømlo Municipality. These islands had recently been connected to Bømlo by road bridges which precipitated the municipal transfer.

Name
The municipality (originally the parish) is named after the old Fitjar farm, since the first Fitjar Church was built there. The name is the plural form of fit which means "vigorous meadow". Before 1900, the name was written "Fitje".

Coat of arms
The coat of arms was granted in the late 1940s. The arms show a golden Viking helmet on a blue background. The helmet and the color are derived from the belief that King Håkon the Good wore a golden helmet at the Battle of Fitjar in 961, which was fought in this municipality.

Churches
The Church of Norway has one parish within the municipality of Fitjar. It is part of the Sunnhordland prosti (deanery) in the Diocese of Bjørgvin.

Government
All municipalities in Norway, including Fitjar, are responsible for primary education (through 10th grade), outpatient health services, senior citizen services, unemployment and other social services, zoning, economic development, and municipal roads. The municipality is governed by a municipal council of elected representatives, which in turn elect a mayor.  The municipality falls under the Haugaland og Sunnhordland District Court and the Gulating Court of Appeal.

Municipal council
The municipal council of Fitjar is made up of 17 representatives that are elected to four year terms. The party breakdown of the council is as follows:

Mayors

History

King Haakon I of Norway (Haakon the Good) maintained his residence at Fitjar. The Battle of Fitjar (Slaget ved Fitjar på Stord) took place in Fitjar on the island of Stord in the year 961 between the forces of King Haakon I and the sons of his half-brother, Eric Bloodaxe. Traditionally, important shipping routes have passed through the area, and the municipality contains several trading posts dating as far back as 1648. Fitjar was separated from Stord in 1863. There have been discussions about a possible reunion of the two municipalities, but no decision has been made.

Geography
The island municipality of Fitjar lies south of the Selbjørnsfjorden, west of the Langenuen strait, east of the island of Bømlo. The municipality includes over 350 islands, although most are uninhabited. The majority of the residents live on the island of Stord, the northern portion of which is in Fitjar. The southern portion of the island is part of the municipality of Stord. The island municipality of Austevoll lies to the north, across the fjord and the island municipality of Tysnes lies across the Langenuen strait to the east, and the island municipality of Bømlo lies to the west.

Attractions

Fitjar Church was built in 1867 over the site of the old medieval stone church which had been demolished. Stone blocks taken from the old stone church were used as foundations for the present-day church as well as for the walling enclosing the churchyard. Opposite Fitjar Church is Haakon's Park (Håkonarparken), the location of a sculpture of Haakon the Good sculpted by Anne Grimdalen. The statue was erected in 1961 at the one thousand year commemoration of the Battle of Fitjar.

Notable people 
 Andreas Fleischer (1878–1957) a theologian, missionary to China, Lutheran Bishop and priest in Fitjar Church 1912-1917 
 Otto Hageberg (1936–2014) a Norwegian literary historian and academic

References

External links
Municipal fact sheet from Statistics Norway 

 
Municipalities of Vestland
1863 establishments in Norway